Thunderbird Lodge may refer to:
Thunderbird Lodge (Lake Tahoe, Nevada), listed on the NRHP in Nevada
Thunderbird Lodge (Rose Valley, Pennsylvania), listed on the NRHP in Pennsylvania
Thunderbird Lodge (Chinle, Arizona), in Arizona